The Ballyhoo Buster is a 1928 American silent Western film. Directed by Richard Thorpe, the film stars Jay Wilsey, Peggy Shaw, and Nancy Nash. It was released on January 8, 1928.

Plot
After selling cattle to two strangers, Bob Warner is later drugged by those same men, who steal the money they had paid for the herd. Penniless, his girl leaves him for a rival suitor. Warner leaves town and meets a medicine show proprietor, who lets him join the show. Warner's job will be to last three rounds with anyone who challenges him in the ring, a "ballyhoo". He becomes quite a draw, and eventually the show makes an appearance in Warner's home town.  He is challenged by the man who stole his girlfriend.  While in the ring with a contestant, he notices the two robbers among the spectators. He knocks out the contestant, then chases after the two crooks.  In the chase, one of the crooks hops into a car and then loses control, plunging over an incline and killing him.  Warner catches up to the other and overcomes him, recovering his money.

Cast list
 Jay Wilsey as Bob Warner (credited as Buffalo Bill Jr.)
 Peggy Shaw as Molly Burnett
 Nancy Nash as Dorothy
 Albert Hart as Medicine show proprietor
 Floyd Shackelford (credited as Floyd Shackleford)
 Lafe McKee
 George Magrill as Brooks Mitchell
 Jack Richardson as Jim Burnett
 Walter Brennan
 Al Taylor

Production
At the beginning of January, Pathé announced that they would be releasing ten films in January, the first of which would be The Ballyhoo Buster. The film was released on January 8, 1928.

Reception
Motion Picture News gave the film a positive review, calling it "... a well told story, capably acted and directed and with a smattering of events that have not as yet been hashed to death by the makers of films of the great outdoors." The Film Daily also gave it a positive review, highlighting the new different angle for a western film. They enjoyed Buffalo Bill's performance, but felt that Thorpe's direction was only satisfactory, but praised the cinematography of Ries.

References

External links
 
 
 

1928 films
Films directed by Richard Thorpe
1928 Western (genre) films
American black-and-white films
Pathé Exchange films
Silent American Western (genre) films
1920s English-language films
1920s American films